, better known by his stage name . is a Japanese musician and singer-songwriter, known for his work with Kuroyume and Sads. In 2003, he began his solo career, performing as both a singer and guitarist.

Music career

Independent career and Kuroyume (1986–1999) 
Kiyoharu's musical career began in 1986 as a member of the independent band Double Bed, which folded after a few months of activity. He then formed Sus4 in 1987, before later joining Garnet. After the disbandment of Garnet in 1991, Kiyoharu, as well as former Garnet bassist, Hitoki, formed Kuroyume. Kuroyume began in the beginning days of the visual kei movement. They progressed from a typical dark image and sound, to a heavy sound influenced by punk rock. The band ended as only a duo with Kiyoharu and Hitoki remaining. After tension on how the band should be managed and health problems for Hitoki, the duo ended the band in 1999.

Sads and Fullface establishment (1999–2003) 
Kiyoharu picked up again with his musical career, forming Sads in 1999. Sads produced a post-punk sound with a heavy surf rock influence. The band eventually formed their own record label, Fullface Records, in 2001, releasing their own material on the label. The label would sign its first act outside Sads, Merry, for their first album Gendai Stoic.

Sads' drummer, Eiji Mitsuzono announced his departure from the band in 2003, leaving the band on an indefinite hiatus.

Solo career (2004–present) 
After the pause in Sads' activities in 2003, Kiyoharu began releasing solo work. His debut album, Poetry, was released in 2004, showcasing not only his vocal skills, but his talent as a guitarist as well. He has collaborated with many artists, including Hyde (L'Arc-en-Ciel), Takanori Nishikawa (T.M. Revolution), Kirito (Pierrot), Atsushi Sakurai (Buck-Tick), Gara (Merry), Sugizo (Luna Sea) etc.

In 2006, Kiyoharu released two singles, as well as a new album, Vinnybeach -Kakuu no Kaigan-, followed by two long, promotional tours. The following single, "Slow", was featured as the opening song for the anime series The Wallflower.

He released another studio album, Forever Love, in 2007. It is dedicated to his father, who died. Kiyoharu released "Aibu" in early 2008, and in May the next single, Samidare, was released.

In 2008, he released a set of twin albums entitled Rhythmless & Perspective light~saw the light & shade and Rhythmless & Perspective shade~saw the light & shade. Each album contained 7 tracks of self-covers from his solo work and his work with Sads. The following year, he released the album Medley, a collection of Kuroyume covers.

On July 11, 2012, he released Under the Sun.

He covered "Sadistic Emotion" by D'erlanger for 2017's D'erlanger Tribute Album ~Stairway to Heaven~.

In 2017, Kiyoharu participated in Sugizo's solo studio album, Oneness M, on the track "Voice".

Kiyoharu released his tenth studio album, Japanese Menu/Distortion 10, on March 25, 2020.

Other careers 
Aside from his work at Fullface Records, Kiyoharu is also a fashion designer, designing his own clothing, accessories, and jewelry.

Discography 
Albums
Poetry (7 April 2004), Universal Japan
Mellow (30 March 2005), Tokyo Rips Pro
Kannou Boogie (7 December 2005), Bouncy
Vinnybeach (12 July 2006), Bouncy
Forever Love (14 November 2007), Mid Field
Rhythmless & Perspective Light: Saw the Light & Shade (10 September 2008)
Rhythmless & Perspective Shade: Saw the Light & Shade (10 September 2008)
Medley (28 January 2009), Avex
Madrigal Of Decadence (29 July 2009), Avex
Under the Sun (7 November 2012), Avex
Soloist (30 March 2016), Warner Music Japan
Yoru, Carmen no Shishuu (28 February 2018), TRIAD
Japanese Menu/Distortion 10 (25 March 2020), Pony Canyon
Singles
"Emily" (9 February 2004), Universal Japan
"Last Song" (16 February 2005), Fullface
"Horizon" (16 March 2005), Tokyo Rips Pro
"Layra" (20 July 2005), Bouncy
"Bask in Art" (9 November 2005), Bouncy
"Wednesday" (30 November 2005), Bouncy
"Seiza no Yoru/Cyclamen no Kahori" (8 March 2006), Bouncy
"Kimi no Koto ga" (17 May 2006), Bouncy
"Slow" (22 November 2006), Bouncy
"Carnation" (13 December 2006), Bouncy
"Tattoo" (22 August 2007), Mid Field
"Rinne" (19 September 2007), Mid Field
"Melodies" (31 October 2007), Mid Field
"Aibu" (23 January 2008), Mid Field
"Samidare" (14 May 2008), Mid Field
"loved" (29 October 2008), Mid Field
"Kurutta Kajitsu" (13 May 2009), Avex
"Darlene" (25 June 2009), Avex
"You" (4 August 2009), Live distribution
"Law's" (13 January 2010), Avex
"Ryusei/The Sun" (23 May 2012), Avex
"Namida ga Afureru)/sari" (22 August 2012), Avex
Yoru o, Omou (9 February 2017), digital download
Best of albums
Singles (24 December 2008), Mid Field
Kuroyume Cover Album "Medley" (28 January 2009), Mid Field/Avex
Compilations
Tribute to Auto-Mod - Flower in the Dark (15 June 1995)
Hide Tribute Spirits (1 May 1999)
Parade -Respective Tracks of Buck-Tick- (21 December 2005)
Tsuchiya Kohey's 25th Celebration "Get Stoned" (21 January 2009), tearbridge Records
Dead End Tribute -Song of Lunatics- (4 September 2013)
DVDs
Aurora (30 October 2003),Universal Japan
Daisan no Tobira (7 April 2004)
Kagefumi (15 September 2004)
Tenshi no Uta (20 July 2005),Bouncy
Mellow (31 August 2005),Bouncy
Groover (February 2006)
Tenshi no Uta '06 'Travel'  (24 January 2007),Toshiba EMI
Clips (27 August 2008),Universal Japan
Kiyoharu 5.21 Performance at Kudan Kaikan Rhythmless & Perspective Live "Light and Shade" (10 September 2008), Mid Field
Forever Love (2009)
The 40th Birthday (24 December 2008), Mid Field
Kuroyume The End: Corkscrew A Go Go(2009), Avex
15 (Documentary of his 15 Anniversary Concerts) (2009), Avex
Play of Medley (2009), Avex
The 41st Birthday (30 December 2009), Avex
Books
Kiyoharu Four My Life (28 May 2011)

See also 
 Kuroyume

References

External links 
 Kiyoharu official site
 Kiyoharu on Avex Group
 

Visual kei musicians
Avex Group artists
Japanese male rock singers
Japanese alternative rock musicians
Japanese punk rock musicians
Japanese fashion designers
1968 births
Living people
Musicians from Gifu Prefecture